Employment Injury Benefits Convention, 1964 is  an International Labour Organization Convention.

It was established in 1964, with the preamble stating:
Having decided upon the adoption of certain proposals with regard to benefits in the case of industrial accidents and occupational diseases,...

Modification 
The convention revised:
Convention C12 - Workmen's Compensation (Agriculture) Convention, 1921
Convention C17 - Workmen's Compensation (Accidents) Convention, 1925
Convention C42 - Workmen's Compensation (Occupational Diseases) Convention (Revised), 1934.

Ratifications
As of 2022, the convention had been ratified by 24 states.

External links 
Text.
Ratifications.

Health treaties
International Labour Organization Conventions
Occupational safety and health treaties
Treaties concluded in 1964
Treaties entered into force in 1967
Treaties of Belgium
Treaties of Bolivia
Treaties of Bosnia and Herzegovina
Treaties of Chile
Treaties of Croatia
Treaties of Cyprus
Treaties of the Democratic Republic of the Congo (1964–1971)
Treaties of Ecuador
Treaties of Finland
Treaties of West Germany
Treaties of Guinea
Treaties of Ireland
Treaties of Japan
Treaties of the Libyan Arab Republic
Treaties of Luxembourg
Treaties of Montenegro
Treaties of the Netherlands
Treaties of Senegal
Treaties of Serbia and Montenegro
Treaties of Yugoslavia
Treaties of Slovenia
Treaties of Sweden
Treaties of North Macedonia
Treaties of Uruguay
Treaties of Venezuela
Treaties extended to Aruba
1964 in labor relations